Hatton, Alabama may refer to: 
Hatton, Colbert County, Alabama, an unincorporated community
Hatton, Lawrence County, Alabama, a census-designated place